De Vis's woolly rat (Mallomys aroaensis) is a species of rodent in the family Muridae.
It is found only in Papua New Guinea.

References

Mallomys
Rodents of New Guinea
Mammals described in 1907
Taxonomy articles created by Polbot
Taxa named by Charles Walter De Vis